Libramont-Chevigny is a municipality of Wallonia located in the province of Luxembourg, Belgium. 

On 1 February 2015, the municipality, which covers 177.86 km², had 10,955 inhabitants, giving a population density of 61,59 inhabitants per km².

The municipality consists of the following districts: Bras, Freux, Libramont, Moircy, Recogne, Remagne, Sainte-Marie-Chevigny, and Saint-Pierre. Other population centers include:

The Ourthe Occidentale river originates in the municipality of Libramont-Chevigny, near the hamlet of Ourt.

Notable people from Libramont-Chevigny
Nade Dieu (born 1973), actress
Jodie Devos (born 1988), operatic soprano
Fiona Ferro (born 1997), tennis player
Guillaume François (born 1990), football player
Anne-Catherine Gillet (born 1975), operatic soprano
David Henen (born 1996), football player
Marie Howet (1897–1984), expressionist painter
 (born 1941), writer
Arnaud de Lie (born 2002), cyclist

See also
 List of protected heritage sites in Libramont-Chevigny

References

External links
 
 (in French)

 
Municipalities of Luxembourg (Belgium)